
Gmina Izbica is a rural gmina (administrative district) in Krasnystaw County, Lublin Voivodeship, in eastern Poland.

The gmina contains part of the protected area called Skierbieszów Landscape Park.

Villages
Gmina Izbica contains the villages and settlements of Bobliwo, Dworzyska, Izbica, Kryniczki, Majdan Krynicki, Mchy, Orłów Drewniany, Orłów Drewniany-Kolonia, Orłów Murowany, Orłów Murowany-Kolonia, Ostrówek, Ostrzyca, Romanów, Stryjów, Tarnogóra, Tarnogóra-Kolonia, Tarzymiechy Drugie, Tarzymiechy Pierwsze, Tarzymiechy Trzecie, Topola, Wał, Wirkowice Drugie, Wirkowice Pierwsze, Wólka Orłowska and Zalesie.

Neighbouring gminas
Gmina Izbica is bordered by the gminas of Gorzków, Kraśniczyn, Krasnystaw, Nielisz, Rudnik, Skierbieszów and Stary Zamość.

Stolpersteine , Winterlingen 
 Dr. Emil Burkart (1884–1957), degree in Human Medicin, entomologist about 9.000 Specimens in the State Museum of Natural History Stuttgart
 Selma Burkart (1885–1942),   Holocaust victim   investigate more detail created the Sister City Izbica/Winterlingen

References

Polish official population figures 2006

Izbica
Krasnystaw County